Notre-Dame-des-Neiges is a municipality in Quebec, Canada. It encircles the city of Trois-Pistoles and includes the offshore Île aux Basques.

Geography

Notre-Dame-des-Neiges is located on the southern slope of the St. Lawrence River, 250 km northeast of Quebec City. Important towns near Notre-Dame-des-Neiges are Rivière-du-Loup 45 km to the south-west and Rimouski 60 km to the northeast. Notre-Dame-des-Neiges is located on Route 293 which connects Trois-Pistoles to Route 232 between Trois-Pistoles to the northwest and Saint-Jean-de-Dieu to the southeast. The territory of Notre-Dame-des-Neiges covers an area of 94.44 km2.

The territory of the municipality of Notre-Dame-des-Neiges partially overlooks the St. Lawrence River and almost completely enclaves the city of Trois-Pistoles. It is part of the regional county municipality of Les Basques in the administrative region of Bas-Saint-Laurent and is crossed by the Trois Pistoles river.

Demographics

Population

Language

See also
 List of municipalities in Quebec

References

External links

Municipalities in Quebec
Incorporated places in Bas-Saint-Laurent